Rupatai Diliprao Patil Nilangekar (born 4 June 1957) is an Indian politician who served as the Member of the Lok Sabha represent the Latur constituency, from 2004 to 2009. She is a member of the Bharatiya Janata Party (BJP) political party.

She is the daughter-in-law of former Chief Minister of Maharashtra, Shivajirao Patil Nilangekar. Her son Sambhaji Patil Nilangekar was appointed minister in Devendra Fadnavis' BJP Government in Maharashtra in 2016.

References

External links
 Official biographical sketch in Parliament of India website

Living people
1957 births
Bharatiya Janata Party politicians from Maharashtra
People from Latur district
India MPs 2004–2009
Marathi politicians
Lok Sabha members from Maharashtra
Women in Maharashtra politics
People from Marathwada
21st-century Indian women politicians
21st-century Indian politicians
People from Bidar
Women members of the Lok Sabha